Kermia daedalea is a species of sea snail, a marine gastropod mollusk in the family Raphitomidae.

Description
The length of the shell varies between 3 mm and 8.5 mm.

The yellowish white shell is maculated with small irregular chestnut-brown spots, mostly confined to the ribs. The whorls are slightly tabulated at the sutures;. The ribs are rounded and compressed, 13-14 on the body whorl, slightly oblique, crossed by small, revolving elevated lines, forming granules at the intersections. The sinus is deep. The outer lip is varicose, crenulate and shortly lirate within. The columella is faintly rugose with oblique wrinkles.

Distribution
This species occurs off Fiji; Vanuatu; Hawaii; South Africa.

References

 Garrett, Andrew. "Descriptions of new species of marine shells inhabiting the South Sea Islands." Proceedings of the Academy of Natural Sciences of Philadelphia (1873): 209-231.
 Hervier, J., 1897 Description d'espèce nouvelles de mollusques provenant de l'archipel de la Nouvelle-Calédonie (suite) Journal de Conchyliologie, 44"1896" 138-151
 Fischer-Piette, E., 1950. Liste des types décrits dans le Journal de Conchyliologie et conservés dans la collection de ce journal (avec planches)(suite). Journal de Conchyliologie 90: 149-180

External links
  Kilburn R.N. (2009) Genus Kermia (Mollusca: Gastropoda: Conoidea: Conidae: Raphitominae) in South African waters, with observations on the identities of related extralimital species. African Invertebrates 50(2): 217-236
 MNHN, Paris: Kermia daedalea (syntype)
 Kazmi, Quddusi B., M. Moazzam, and Razia Sultana. "Marine Molluscan fauna Of the Pakistani coastal waters."
 Moretzsohn, Fabio, and E. Alison Kay. "HAWAIIAN MARINE MOLLUSCS." (1995)
 Gastropods.com: Kermia daedalea

daedalea
Gastropods described in 1873